Sutrisno or Sutrisna is an Indonesian surname. Notable people with the surname include:

Ade Sutrisna (1974–2016), Indonesian badminton player
Bambang Sutrisno (born 1941), Indonesian embezzlement fugitive
Try Sutrisno (born 1935), Indonesian vice president from 1993 to 1998

Indonesian-language surnames